German Channel is an artificial channel dug into the Palau's barrier reef in the south-west that connects the lagoon to the Pacific Ocean. The channel was made by the Germans during the time when Palau was a German colony. Presently, it is a popular dive site.

See also
Rock Islands
Blue Corner

References

Underwater diving sites of Palau
Channels of Oceania
Koror